Joseph Eugene Porter Jr. (born July 26, 2000) is an American football cornerback for the Penn State Nittany Lions. He is the son of the former NFL linebacker Joey Porter.

High school career
Porter Jr. attended North Catholic High School in Cranberry Township, Butler County, Pennsylvania before transferring to North Allegheny Senior High School in Wexford, Pennsylvania. He played cornerback and wide receiver in high school. He committed to Penn State to play college football.

College career
In his first year at Penn State in 2019, Porter Jr. played in four games and had three tackles. In 2020, he started all eight games recording 33 tackles and one sack. In 2021, he started all 13 games and had 50 tackles and one interception. Porter Jr. returned to Penn State in 2022 rather than enter the 2022 NFL Draft.

Personal life
He is the son of Joey Porter, a former NFL linebacker for the Pittsburgh Steelers, Miami Dolphins, and Arizona Cardinals.

References

External links
 
 Penn State Nittany Lions bio

Living people
Players of American football from Pennsylvania
American football cornerbacks
Penn State Nittany Lions football players
2000 births